Enoplidia simplex is a moth in the family Oecophoridae. It was described by Turner in 1896. It is found in Australia, where it has been recorded from Queensland, New South Wales and Victoria.

The wingspan is about 20 mm. The forewings are plain dark brown. The hindwings are plain pale yellow.

The larvae feed on dead phyllodes of Eucalyptus and Acacia species. They construct a shelter of two irregular pieces of dead phyllode joined by silk. Pupation takes place in a cocoon, formed inside the shelter.

References

Moths described in 1896
Enoplidia